Tom Raney is an American comic book artist known for illustrating titles as Annihilation: Conquest, Alpha Flight, Ultimate X-Men and Uncanny X-Men for Marvel Comics, DV8 and Stormwatch for Image Comics, and Outsiders for DC Comics.

Early life
Tom Raney attended Joe Kubert School of Cartoon and Graphic Art in Dover, New Jersey. In 1986, he met his future wife there, Gina Going. Raney, who was a year ahead of Going in the school's three-year program, was introduced to her by an instructor.

Career
Raney's first paid work was Forgotten Realms for DC Comics. His first work with his wife Gina Going-Raney was The Warlock Chronicles, a series that was published by Marvel Comics.

Raney is best known for his work on such series as  Annihilation: Conquest, Alpha Flight, Ultimate X-Men, Uncanny X-Men, DV8, Stormwatch,   and Outsiders.

Recent work includes the limited series Dark Reign: Hawkeye, with writer Andy Diggle.

Personal life
Raney and his wife, Gina Going-Raney, married in 1990, shortly after graduation from the Kubert School. They live in Sparta Township, New Jersey, on the eastern shore of Lake Mohawk.

Bibliography

DC
Action Comics #801 (2003)
Batman: Shadow of the Bat Annual #2 (1994)
Forgotten Realms #17, 20, Annual #1 (1990–91)
Outsiders, vol. 3, #1-3, 7–10, 13-15 (2003–04)

Image
Deathblow #16 (among other artists) (1995)
Gen 13 #24 (among other artists) (1997)
Stormwatch #37-50 (1996–97)
Team One: Stormwatch, miniseries, #1-2 (199)
Wetworks #11-13 (among other artists) (1995)
Wildstorm!, miniseries, (Stormwatch) #4 (1995)
Wildstorm Chamber of Horrors (Savant story) (1995)

Marvel
Alpha Flight/Inhumans (1998)
Annihilation: Conquest, miniseries, #1-6 (2007–08)
Avengers Academy #7, 11–12, 15–16, 19–20, 23, 25-26 (2010-2012)
Black Widow: Deadly Origin, miniseries, #1-4 (2009–10)
Captain America, vol. 2, #7 (among other artists) (1996)
Civil War: The Return (2007)
Dark Reign: Hawkeye #1-4 (2009–10)
Deathlok #20 (along with J.J. Birch) (1993)
Double Dragon #1-3 (1991)
Exiles Annual # (2007)
Incredible Hulks #612, 615 (2010)
Mutant X #1-3, 5 (full art); #12 (among other artists) (1998–99)
Namor Annual #2 (1992)
Secret Invasion: Inhumans, miniseries, #1-4 (2008–09)
The Sentry: Fallen Sun #1 (2010)
Silver Surfer, vol. 2, #59 (1991)
Thor vol. 2, #45-46, 49–51, 55 (2002–03)
Ultimate Secret, miniseries, #3-4 (2005)
Ultimate X-Men #66-68, 72–73, Annual #1 (2005–06)
Uncanny X-Men #291-293, 374, 377–380, 382, 393, 399, 460–461, Annual #15 (1991–2005)
Warlock and the Infinity Watch #7-8, 12-13 (1992–93)
What If Magneto have formed the X-Men? (2005)
X-Factor #76 (1992)
X-Men, vol. 2 (then X-Men: Legacy) #95, 103 (1999-2000), #241 (2010)
X-Men: Search for Cyclops, miniseries, #1-4 (2000)
X-Men Unlimited (Magneto story) #24 (1999)

Other publishers
Star Wars #7 (along with Rob Pereira) (Dark Horse, 1999)

Notes

References

Tom Raney at Marvel.com

External links

Year of birth missing (living people)
Living people
American comics artists
The Kubert School alumni
People from Sparta, New Jersey